ISO 3166-2:CH is the entry for Switzerland in ISO 3166-2, part of the ISO 3166 standard published by the International Organization for Standardization (ISO), which defines codes for the names of the principal subdivisions (e.g., provinces or states) of all countries coded in ISO 3166-1.

The abbreviation is derived from Latin name for Switzerland,  ("Helvetic Confederation").

Currently for Switzerland, ISO 3166-2 codes are defined for 26 cantons.

Each code consists of two parts, separated by a hyphen. The second part is two letters, currently used in vehicle registration plates.

Current codes
Subdivision names are listed as in the ISO 3166-2 standard published by the ISO 3166 Maintenance Agency (ISO 3166/MA).

ISO 639-1 codes are used to represent subdivision names in the following administrative languages:
 (de): German
 (fr): French
 (it): Italian
 (rm): Romansh

Click on the button in the header to sort each column.

Changes
The following changes to the entry have been announced in newsletters by the ISO 3166/MA since the first publication of ISO 3166-2 in 1998:

See also
 Subdivisions of Switzerland
 FIPS region codes of Switzerland
 NUTS codes of Switzerland
 Comparison of ISO, FIPS, and NUTS codes of the cantons of Switzerland

External links
 ISO Online Browsing Platform: CH
 Cantons of Switzerland, Statoids.com

2:CH
ISO 3166-2
Switzerland geography-related lists